Athletes from the Netherlands competed at the 1980 Winter Olympics in Lake Placid, United States.

Medalists

Ice hockey

First Round - Red Division

All times are local (UTC-5).

Contestants
Ron Berteling
Klaas van den Broek
Brian de Bruijn
John de Bruyn (G)
Dick Decloe
Rick van Gog
Corky de Graauw
Jack de Heer
Harrie van Heumen
Henk Hille
Chuck Huizinga
Jan Janssen
William Klooster
Patrick Kolijn
Leo Koopmans
Ted Lenssen (G)
George Peternousek
Al Pluymers 
Frank van Soldt
Larry van Wieren

Speed skating

Men

Women

References
Official Olympic Reports
International Olympic Committee results database
Olympic Winter Games 1980, full results by sports-reference.com

Nations at the 1980 Winter Olympics
1980
W